Beaume may refer to:

Several communes in France
La Beaume, arrondissement of Gap, Hautes-Alpes
La Haute-Beaume, arrondissement of Gap, Hautes-Alpes
Beaumes-de-Venise, a canton of the arrondissement of Carpentras, Vaucluse
Muscat de Beaumes-de-Venise, the sweet wine appellation, and "Beaume de Venise", the wine grape
Beaumettes, also a canton of Carpentras.
Beaumé, a commune in the arrondissement of Vervins, Aisne

Other
Antoine Baumé (1728–1804), French chemist
Baume et Mercier, Swiss watchmakers
The Beaume (river), a tributary of the Ardèche (river) in southern France

See also
Baume (disambiguation)
Beaune